Omorgus birmanicus is a species of hide beetle in the subfamily Omorginae and subgenus Afromorgus.

References

birmanicus
Beetles described in 1927